HaRav Simcha Zissel Halevi Levovitz (1908–2001) was a Lithuanian-born American rabbi and founder of the first Mesivta (Jewish High School) in Boro Park, Brooklyn, and a teacher of thousands of students.

Biography
He was born in 1908 in Ozovnet, Lithuania.  His father, Musar movement leader Rabbi Yeruchom Levovitz, was the spiritual leader of Yeshivas Mir.

Simcha Zissel studied in the yeshivas of Grodno, Telz and Brisk.  At the start of World War II, he was able to flee to the United States due to the efforts of Rabbi Elimelech Gavriel (Mike) Tress.

Simcha Zissel settled in Brooklyn, New York where he married the daughter of Rabbi Naftali Carlebach, Chief Rabbi of Berlin, Germany. After WWII, Rabbi Carlebach established the famous synagogue Kehilath Jacob on the Upper West Side, New York City.

After his marriage, Simcha Zissel founded the first yeshiva high school in Boro Park.  In addition to studying and teaching, he dedicated himself to publishing the writings of his father, Yeruchom Levovitz and of the rabbi after whom he was named, Simcha Zissel Ziv.

Simcha Zissel and his wife had three sons and one daughter. His sons are all rabbis: Yeruchom, Yisroel, and Osher Michoel. His son-in-law is Rabbi Avrohom Moshe Faivelson.

Article
In the Glow of the Mashgiach

Rav Simcha Zissel was born to his illustrious father, Rav Yeruchom Levovitz, the mashgiach of 
the Mir, and to his mother Rivka, in the year 1908. 
At the time, Rav Yeruchom had not yet assumed the position as mashgiach of the Mirer yeshiva, 
and he was serving as the menahel ruchani of the venerated Kelmer Talmud Torah. Rav 
Yeruchom had himself been one of the most esteemed graduates of the Talmud Torah, a prize 
talmid of the Alter of Kelm. The family resided in the nearby town of Užventis (pronounced 
Uzvent). 
The child was named Simcha Zissel, after Rav Yeruchom’s Rebbe, the Alter of Kelm, one of the 
pioneers of the derech hamussar. In time, Rav Simcha Zissel would dedicate his life to 
perpetuating and disseminating mussar, and a fiery ba’al mussar in his own right. 
Rav Simcha Zissel’s chinuch was at the feet of his holy father, and that influence remained with 
him his entire life. The shmuessen of Rav Yeurchom in the Mir were legendary. In general, the 
mashgiach was deeply revered by all the talmidim, but the weekly chumash shiur— at which he 
would draw out the machshavah, and a pure Torah philosophy from the parshah—was another 
level. Talmidim would describe the aura, the reverence... how one could hear a pin drop during 
the entire time. Talmidim were arranged in a semi-circle around the mashgiach, and they would 
drink in every syllable with great thirst. One of the more prominent ones, who was also the ba’al 
koreh in the Mir, was Rav Aaron Yeshaya Shapiro, a great-grandfather of this writer, who later 
served as a Rosh Yeshiva in Torah Vodaath for four decades. He transcribed a wealth of these 
shmuessen, which became part of the seforim that Rav Simcha Zissel later published. 
Rav Simcha Zissel was highly regarded in the Mir, and was seen by many as a future successor 
to his father. In addition to the Mir, he spent two years learning in Kelm, absorbing the spirit that 
further shaped him in the ways of mussar. He also learned in Grodno, as well as in Brisk, where 
he became a talmid muvhak of the Brisker Rov. 

Disseminating Mussar 

World War II changed the course of his life, and he was fortunate to escape the fate of so many 
from that prewar Torah world, through Shanghai. Arriving in America in 1941, he joined the 
fledgling yeshiva in White Plains, which later became BMG of Lakewood. There, he was 
reunited with at least two Kelmer alumni, Rav Nosson Wachtfogel, the mashgiach of Lakewood, 
and Rav Hirsh Genauer (another great-grandfather of this writer). 
He taught in the Mirer Yeshiva in Flatbush, alongside Rav Leib Malin with whom he was very 
close. In 1944, he married Rebbetzin Shulamis, the daughter of Rav Naftoli Carlebach, zt”l,
originally from Germany, who hailed from generations of Rabbonim. 
But he ached to perpetuate the legacy of his father, and his holy path. 
Around 1950, he founded the yeshiva Chochma Umussar in Boro Park, an institution through 
which he shaped and influenced countless bachurim. 
Rav Lipa Geldwerth, shlit”a, a Boro Park native, and talmid of Rav Simcha Zissel, recalled: 
“We were fine bachurim, but our postwar generation was too distant from the aura of the world 
that the Rosh Yeshiva knew (in his introduction to his father’s seforim, he laments the lowliness
of America and how it represents the darkness before the dawn of Moshiach). Rav Simcha Zissel 
possessed the abilities to erect a bridge through which we too could be inspired. He understood 
the nature of each talmid, their talents and desires. He bequeathed us the gift of mussar through 
his deep wisdom. He did not demand perfection from us; he aroused in each of us the desire to 
demand it from ourselves!”

The Life of Ba’al Mussar 

Another Talmid of the yeshiva in Boro Park was Rav Yeruchom Olshin, shlit”a, who observed 
the Rosh Yeshiva carried out his unique shlichus of transmitting the teachings of his father, and 
of his predecessors, to perfection. 
Indeed, he toiled for his entire life to publish and disseminate the teachings of Rav Yeruchom 
and of his Rebbe, the Alter of Kelm. The fruits of his work were Da’as Torah, Da’as Chochmah 
Umussar, Chochma Umussar, and other works. These emerged in various editions, some by his 
children after his passing. This work took no small amount of toil, and required a deep 
familiarity with Torah generally, and with Rav Yeruchom’s style and intention in particular. 
But these endeavors were not merely the work of an elucidator; Rav Simcha Zissel lived mussar. 
He was a ga’on in his own right, who would speak drawing from all areas of Torah, and he was 
shaped by mussar. He never wavered from something he thought was right, and he pursued the
truth fiercely. He was possessed of incredible middos... ah shtick mussar. 
In later years, he also dedicated himself to renovating the matzeivah of his father—likewise, an 
immense undertaking that took much effort.
At his levaya, Rav Shlome Wolbe, a prize talmid of Rav Yeruchom, expressed the debt of 
gratitude that all of Klal Yisroel owes to Rav Simcha Zissel for his life’s work: “Not a day goes 
by when I don’t utilize the seforim—including Rav Simcha Zissel’s introductions, which are 
themselves seforim.”
On 2 Av, 2001, Rav Simcha Zissel was niftar after a short illness, concluding a lifetime of 
inspiring and elevating himself, and his fellow Yidden through the beauty of Torah and mussar, 
and bequeathing the Torah world the timeless teachings of the greatest gedolim of the mussar
movement.

Article Following his Funeral
This past Monday 3 Av, thousands of bnei Torah, headed by roshei yeshiva and rabbonim, accompanied the gaon and tzaddik, HaRav Simcha Zissel Halevi Levovitz zt"l on his last earthy journey. He was a vestige of dor dei'ah, the son of the Mashgiach, HaRav Yeruchom of Mir ztvk"l, and was 93 at the time of his petiroh.

HaRav Simcha Zissel HaLevi Levovitz was born in 5668 (1908) in the Lithuanian town of Ozovnet. At the time of his birth, his father HaRav Yeruchom was the menahel ruchani of the yeshiva of Radin, and would return to his home only on holidays.

In his youth, HaRav Simcha Zissel studied in the best yeshivos of that time -- Grodno, Telz and Brisk -- becoming among those yeshivos' finest students, and in particular becoming close to Maran the Rov of Brisk. With the outbreak of the Second World War, he immigrated to America. In America he married the daughter of HaRav Naftoli Carlebach zt"l.

After his marriage he founded a yeshiva in Boro Bark, from which he produced an entire generation of students. For over fifty years he taught and studied Torah, and published his father's writings and those of the great mussar geonim, whose ways he embodied and whose approach to study he followed.

He was an outstanding talmid chochom, well versed in every aspect of the Torah. For scores of years he dedicated himself to the task of publishing his father's works, in the form of the many volumes of Daas Chochmoh Umussar, which truly enlightened the world with his father's wisdom. He knew his father's teachings by heart and felt that publishing those works was his main purpose in life.

At the levaya, HaRav Shlomo Wolbe said that he owed HaRav Simcha Zissel a deep debt of gratitude. "There wasn't a day in which I didn't study those seforim. The introductions to each volume, were themselves like books," HaRav Wolbe said.

For years he served as the rosh yeshiva of the Boro Park yeshiva, where he taught many students, some of whom who were literally saved spiritually on his merit. These students were deeply attached to him for years and today many of them hold Torah positions in Eretz Yisroel and the United States. He was the head of the entire Levovitz family, and saw to the needs of all of Rav Yeruchom's offspring, carrying the burden of the family on his broad shoulders.

Recently he fell ill and did not recover. His levaya in the United States was attended by a massive throng which accompanied him to the airport. When the aron arrived at the Mirrer yeshiva in Jerusalem, it was met by thousands of bnei Torah and his students, headed by roshei yeshiva and rabbonim. Hespedim were delivered by: HaRav Shlomo Wolbe, HaRav Boruch Dov Povarsky, one of the roshei yeshiva of Ponevezh and HaRav Yeruchom Kaplan, the niftar's nephew. At the closing of the grave, his nephews, HaRav Tzvi Kaplan and HaRav Naftoli Kaplan delivered hespedim.

He is survived by three sons and one daughter. His sons are: HaRav Yeruchom, HaRav Yisroel and HaRav Osher Michoel. His son-in-law is HaRav Avrohom Moshe Faivelson. His entire family, including his grandchildren and great-grandchildren, are following in his footsteps.

References

1908 births
2001 deaths
Musar movement
20th-century American rabbis